Taylor Hunter (born July 7, 1993) is an American soccer player.

Career

Youth and College
Hunter played youth soccer for Real Colorado before spending his entire college career at the University of Denver.  He made a total of 69 appearances for the Pioneers and was named CoSIDA Academic All-District 7 First Team three years in a row.

Professional
On January 20, 2015, Hunter was selected in the third round (49th overall) of the 2015 MLS SuperDraft by the Houston Dynamo and signed a professional contract with the club a month later.  On April 11, Hunter was sent on loan to USL club Colorado Springs Switchbacks FC.  He made his professional debut that same day in a 1–0 victory over Real Monarchs SLC. He scored his first league goal for the club on 24 June 2015 in a 5-0 home victory over Orange County SC. His goal, the fourth of the match, came in the 59th minute.

Hunter joined United Soccer League side Rio Grande Valley FC Toros for their 2016 season. He made his league debut for the club on 26 March 2016 in a 2-0 away loss against Tulsa Roughnecks FC. He returned to Houston Dynamo on March 1, 2017.

References

External links

Denver Pioneers bio
USSF Development Academy bio

1993 births
American soccer players
Association football defenders
Colorado Springs Switchbacks FC players
Denver Pioneers men's soccer players
Houston Dynamo FC draft picks
Houston Dynamo FC players
Living people
Major League Soccer players
Rio Grande Valley FC Toros players
Soccer players from Colorado
Sportspeople from Aurora, Colorado
USL Championship players